Pseudoliotia henjamensis is a species of sea snail, a marine gastropod mollusk in the family Tornidae.

Distribution
This species occurs in the Red Sea.

References

External links
 To World Register of Marine Species

henjamensis
Gastropods described in 1903